There are several islands named Horseshoe Island:

Horseshoe Island (Antarctica)
Horseshoe Island (Wisconsin)
Horseshoe Island, Bermuda
Horseshoe Island, Queensland